Ney Nardeban (also Romanized as Ney Nardebān and Ney Nardobān; also known as Ney Nardebām) is a village in Tombi Golgir Rural District, Golgir District, Masjed Soleyman County, Khuzestan Province, Iran. At the 2006 census, its population was 12, in 4 families.

References 

Populated places in Masjed Soleyman County